General Sir Patrick Stuart GCMG (10 June 1777 – 7 February 1855) was a British Army officer who became Governor of Malta.

Military career
Born the second son of the 10th Lord Blantyre, Stuart was commissioned into the 2nd Regiment of Life Guards in 1794. He became inspecting field officer of the militia in the Ionian Islands in 1816. He went on to be Commander-in-Chief, Scotland in 1830 (and from 1836, Governor of Edinburgh Castle) and Governor of Malta in 1843 before retiring in 1847.

He served as Colonel of the 44th (East Essex) Regiment of Foot from 1843 until his death and was promoted to full general in 1851.

 
He died at his home, Eaglescairnie House in East Lothian, on 7 February 1855.
His will is in the National Archives.

References

 

1777 births
1855 deaths
Knights Grand Cross of the Order of St Michael and St George
Younger sons of barons
2nd Regiment of Life Guards officers
44th Regiment of Foot officers
British Army generals
Scottish generals
Deputy Lieutenants of East Lothian
Directors of the Bank of Scotland